The mudflap girl is an iconic silhouette of a woman with an hourglass body shape, sitting, leaning back on her hands, with her hair being blown in the wind. The icon is typically found on mudflaps, clothing, and other items associated with trucking in the United States. The image is sometimes also known as trucker girl, trucker lady, or seated lady.

This famous design was created in the 1970s by Bill Zinda of Wiz Enterprises in Long Beach, California, to promote his line of truck and auto accessories. It is variously claimed to be modeled on Leta Laroe, a famous exotic dancer at the time; or on Rachel Ann Allen, a friend's wife, and mother of Ed Allen, the trademark's owner.

The Mudflap Girl received a trademark registration from the United States Patent and Trademark Office in January of 2010.

Parody

 As a parody, Wyoming Libraries use a mudflap girl holding a book, in an effort to attract readers.
 In issue #4 of the Dreamwave Productions comic Transformers: The War Within, Optimus Prime is portrayed as having a mudflap with the silhouette of Elita One.
 The Mudflap girl (as a chicken) was used in the Wacky Package "Perdude Chicken", parodying Perdue Farms.
 The feminist blog Feministing used as its logo an ironic version of the mudflap girl holding up her middle finger.
 The "Feministas" protest group in Futurama: Into the Wild Green Yonder has a similar logo in pink that has the mudflap girl using a megaphone.
 Silhouette stickers of a chubby male with a beer belly are also available.

References

Automotive accessories
Symbols introduced in the 1970s
Silhouettes